XHPIXT-FM is a radio station on 98.9 FM in Asunción Nochixtlán, Oaxaca. It is owned by the Vera Hernández family and is known as La Grandiosa de Nochixtlán.

History
XHPIXT was awarded in the IFT-4 radio auction of 2017 and came to air in April 2018. The Vera Hernández family, which owns the concessionaires of XHPIXT-FM as well as XHPSEB-FM in Santiago Juxtlahuaca and XHPLEO-FM in Huajuapan de León, is involved in the leather business.

References

Radio stations in Oaxaca
Radio stations established in 2018
2018 establishments in Mexico